Asanga Jayasooriya (born 28 September 1971) is a Sri Lankan former first class cricketer. He stood as an umpire in the tour match between Sri Lanka Board President's XI vs Indian national cricket team in August 2015.

References

External links
 

1971 births
Living people
Sri Lankan cricketers
Sri Lankan cricket umpires
People from Matara, Sri Lanka